Events in the year 2005 in Spain.

Incumbents
 Monarch: Juan Carlos I
 Prime Minister: José Luis Rodríguez Zapatero

Events

Arts and entertainment

Sports

Births

 5 June: Irene Urdangarín y de Borbón, daughter of Infanta Cristina of Spain and Iñaki Urdangarín
 31 October: Infanta Leonor of Spain, daughter of Felipe, Prince of Asturias and Letizia, Princess of Asturias

Deaths
 4 December: Gloria Lasso, 83, singer
 15 December: Julián Marías, 91, philosopher and father of author Javier Marías
 19 December: Julio Iglesias Sr., 90, Spanish gynaecologist, one of the oldest men to have fathered a child (also Julio Iglesias's father and Enrique Iglesias's grandfather)

See also
 2005 in Spanish television
 List of Spanish films of 2005

References

 
Spain
Years of the 21st century in Spain